Tumbuka may refer to:
Tumbuka people, a Bantu people of eastern Zambia, northern Malawi and Tanzania
Tumbuka language, their Bantu language